Marta Galimany Guasch (born 5 October 1985) is a Spanish long distance runner who specialises in the marathon.

Personal bests
Outdoor
10,000 metres – 33:11.41 (Torrevieja 2021)
10 km – 33:08 (Valencia 2018)
One hour (track) - 17.546m NR (Brussels 2020) 
Half marathon – 1:11:08 (Gdynia 2020)
Marathon – 2:29:02 (Seville 2020)

Achievements

2018 World half marathon controversy
In 2018, both Carles Castillejo and Marta Galimany were selected by the Spanish National Athletics Federation to compete in the World Half Marathon Championships, among other five athletes per sex, being held in Valencia later that year. However, two days before the race, it was announced that a mistake took place by the federation while reading the rule book for that championships, and that the event only accepted 5 athletes per nation. Therefore, both Marta and Carles were ejected from the national team and could not compete in the event, what caused a massive controversy.

References

External links
 
 
 
 

1985 births
Living people
Spanish female marathon runners
Mediterranean Games silver medalists for Spain
Mediterranean Games medalists in athletics
Athletes (track and field) at the 2018 Mediterranean Games
Athletes from Catalonia
People from Valls
Sportspeople from the Province of Tarragona
Athletes (track and field) at the 2020 Summer Olympics
Olympic athletes of Spain
21st-century Spanish women
20th-century Spanish women